Oscar Jonsson may refer to:

 Oscar Jonsson (bandy) (born 1977), Swedish bandy player
 Oscar Jonsson (footballer) (born 1997), Swedish footballer